Amleto Palermi (11 July 1889 – 20 April 1941) was an Italian film director and screenwriter. He directed more than 70 films between 1914 and 1942. He directed The Old Lady, which starred Vittorio De Sica in his first sound film.

Selected filmography

 The Story of a Poor Young Man (1920)
 A Woman's Story (1920)
 The Second Wife (1922)
 La dama de Chez Maxim's (1923)
 The Last Days of Pompeii (1926)
 The Flight in the Night (1926)
 Floretta and Patapon (1927)
 The Confessions of a Woman (1928)
 The Old Lady (1932)
 Zaganella and the Cavalier (1932)
 La segretaria per tutti (1933)
Nini Falpala (1933)
 Port (1934)
 Creatures of the Night (1934)
 The Matchmaker (1934)
 God's Will Be Done (1936)
 Il signor Max (1937)
 To Live (1937)
 The Two Misanthropists (1937)
 The Black Corsair (1937)
 Naples of Olden Times (1938)
 Departure (1938)
 The Two Mothers (1938)
 Naples Will Never Die (1939)
 The Sons of the Marquis Lucera (1939)
 Saint John, the Beheaded (1940)
 The Sinner (1940)
 The Happy Ghost (1941)

References

External links

1889 births
1941 deaths
Italian film directors
20th-century Italian screenwriters
Italian male screenwriters
Writers from Rome
20th-century Italian male writers